The 1971 Cronulla-Sutherland Sharks season was the 5th in club's history. They competed in the NSWRFL's 1971 premiership. The Sharks also won the Endeavour Cup this year. The Endeavour Cup competition was only run for two years, it was a knockout competition involving the teams that didn't make the final five for that year. The trophy was recently found at the club thanks to a request from life member Andrew Downie.

Ladder

References

Cronulla-Sutherland Sharks seasons
Cronulla-Sutherland Sharks season